Perundurai taluk is a taluk of Erode district of the Indian state of Tamil Nadu. The headquarters of the taluk is the town of Perundurai. It falls under Erode Revenue Division.

Demographics
According to the 2011 census, the taluk of Perundurai had a population of 269,600 with 135,850  males and 133,750 females. There were 985 women for every 1000 men. The taluk had a literacy rate of 67.84. Child population in the age group below 6 was 10,358 Males and 9,818 Females.

See also
Komayanvalasu
Perundurai block

References

External links
 https://web.archive.org/web/20180330160655/http://www.erode.tn.nic.in/taluk.htm

Taluks of Erode district